The 1944 Lower Hutt mayoral election was part of the New Zealand local elections held that same year. The elections were held for the role of Mayor of Lower Hutt plus other local government positions including twelve city councillors, also elected triennially. The polling was conducted using the standard first-past-the-post electoral method.

Background
The incumbent Mayor, Jack Andrews, sought re-election for a sixth term. Andrews was opposed by Labour Party candidate Percy Dowse, a councillor between 1935 and 1938, who had challenged Andrews in 1938. Taking place during a period of rapid population growth in the area, it was the first election after the addition of the new suburbs of Epuni, Waddington and Naenae.

Mayoral results

Councillor results

Notes

References

Mayoral elections in Lower Hutt
1944 elections in New Zealand
Politics of the Wellington Region